James O. Taylor (1887–1974), generally credited as J.O. Taylor, was an American cinematographer best known for his work on King Kong (1933).

Selected filmography

 A Son of Erin (1916)
 The Bond Between (1917)
 A Daughter of the Wolf (1919)
 Behind the Door (1919)
 Below the Surface (1920)
 A Thousand to One (1920)
The Brute Master (1920)
 Blind Hearts (1921)
 A Private Scandal (1921)
 The Sea Lion (1921)
 The Cup of Life (1921)
 Man Alone (1923)
 The Last Moment (1923)
 Scars of Jealousy (1923)
 The House of Youth (1924)
 The Uninvited Guest (1924)
 The Better Way (1926)
 The Lone Wolf Returns (1926)
 The Sea Wolf (1926)
 Bigger Than Barnum's (1926)
 Sweet Rosie O'Grady (1926)
 Remember (1926)
 The Belle of Broadway (1926)
 Obey the Law (1926)
 For Ladies Only (1927)
 Birds of Prey (1927)
 Alias the Lone Wolf (1927)
 Wandering Girls (1927)
 The Blood Ship (1927)
 Afraid to Love (1927)
 Stolen Pleasures (1927)
 Sally in Our Alley (1927)
 The Price of Honor (1927)
 By Whose Hand? (1927)
 The Bachelor's Baby (1927)
 Pleasure Before Business (1927)
 The Haunted Ship (1927)
 The Kid Sister (1927)
 Coney Island (1928)
 The Wreck of the Singapore (1928)
 Chicago After Midnight (1928)
 Fashion Madness (1928)
 Happy Days (1929)
 Smoke Bellew (1929)
 Song o' My Heart (1930)
 A Soldier's Plaything (1930)
 The Monkey's Paw (1933)
 King Kong (1933)
 Son of Kong (1933)

References

Bibliography
 Darby, William. Masters of Lens and Light: A Checklist of Major Cinematographers and Their Feature Films. Scarecrow Press, 1991.
 Soister, John T., Nicolella, Henry & Joyce, Steve. American Silent Horror, Science Fiction and Fantasy Feature Films, 1913-1929. McFarland, 2014.

External links

1887 births
1974 deaths
American cinematographers
People from Virginia